Bogaya (Pogaya) is a Papuan language of Papua New Guinea. In Western Province, Bogaya is spoken in Olsobip Rural LLG and Nomad Rural LLG. It is also spoken in Koroba-Kopiago District, Hela Province.

References

Duna–Pogaya languages
Languages of Western Province (Papua New Guinea)
Languages of Southern Highlands Province
Language isolates of New Guinea